Benidorm is a British sitcom written and created by Derren Litten and produced by Tiger Aspect for ITV that aired for ten series from 1 February 2007 until 2 May 2018. The series features an ensemble cast of holiday makers and staff at the Solana all-inclusive hotel in Benidorm, Spain over the course of a week each year.

On 5 July 2018, series creator and writer Derren Litten confirmed that series 10 would be the last after the series was axed by ITV. Benidorm Live, a stage adaption written by Litten, was announced with 250 shows scheduled in theatres across the United Kingdom and Ireland.

Plot

The series follows holidaymakers who spend a week at the Solana Resort Benidorm, Spain. It is usually the same people who go at the same time of year, usually by coincidence. As people say, those who come to Benidorm "can never stay away" or "never come back". Some higher-class people who come to the Solana are not satisfied with its facilities or the holidaymakers who go there, though others enjoy themselves, mostly due to the fact that it is all-inclusive.

Episodes

Production

Development
In 2006, Derren Litten pitched a new comedy that he had devised for ITV, focusing on an all-inclusive holiday resort, which was later confirmed to be titled Benidorm, and began airing on 1 February 2007. After the first series concluded on 8 March 2007, ITV renewed it for a second series, which commenced in April 2008, with all the main characters returning for the eight-episode series. As a result of the second series' finale being left on a cliff hanger, a special was broadcast on 31 May 2009, to expand the events that occurred in the final episode of series 2, before a third series began on 2 October that same year, in a new 45-minute episode format.

With the programme's success uprising, a fourth series was commissioned; it was later decided that the fourth series would air in 2011, with a Christmas special airing in December 2010. After cast member Geoffrey Hutchings' sudden death in July 2010 from a suspected viral infection, the Christmas special was forced to be heavily rewritten, though did broadcast on 26 December 2010. Hutchings' character was then killed off-screen at the conclusion of this episode, which was viewed by 7.41 million. Despite speculation of a possible cancellation, Benidorm did return for its planned fourth series, which began 25 February 2011, in which has been considered as the best series of the show. Litten then planned to conclude the show at the end of the fourth series, though high demands from viewers resulted in him rapidly reversing his decision.

After the fifth series, broadcast between 24 February and 6 April 2012, concluded, the programme took a year-long hiatus from television, with the sixth series beginning on 2 January 2014. From then onwards, the programme would continue to see the average viewership decrease slowly across the next few series. Series 7 was broadcast from 2 January to 13 February 2015, series 8 from 11 January to 22 February 2016, series 9 from 1 March to 3 May 2017, and series 10 from 28 February to 2 May 2018.

Casting

Series 1 introduced the main characters: the Garvey family, which included parents Mick (Steve Pemberton) and Janice (Siobhan Finneran), teenage daughter Chantelle (Hannah Hobley) and eight-year-old son Michael (Oliver Stokes); Janice's mother Madge (Sheila Reid); Jacqueline (Janine Duvitski) and Donald Stewart (Kenny Ireland); Kate (Abigail Cruttenden) and Martin Weedon (Nicholas Burns); Geoff Maltby (Johnny Vegas), who calls himself "The Oracle", and his mother Noreen (Elsie Kelly); Gavin Ramsbottom (Hugh Sachs) and Troy Ganatra (Paul Bazely) and the Solana staff: barman Mateo Castellanos (Jake Canuso) and manageress Janey Yorke (Crissy Rock). Niky Wardley appeared in a recurring role, portraying the role of Kelly, Mateo's lover, whilst Ella Kenion made a guest appearance in the third episode as an unnamed con artist. All regular cast members returned for the second series, with Geoffrey Hutchings joining the cast as Mel Harvey, the new multi-millionaire boyfriend of Madge, and Chantelle's baby son "Coolio". Furthermore, Wardley reprised her role as Kelly, with Wendy Richard making a guest appearance in one episode as her mother, a wheelchair-riding love rival for Madge; other guest stars included Margi Clarke as Dorothy, Gavin's estranged mother and Elliott Jordan portrayed Jack, a British bar-owner with whom Janice found temptation.

In the third series, all cast members once again returned, though Abigail Cruttenden only returned for the final two episodes, with Sheridan Smith portraying the role of Brandy, as a brief replacement for her character, as a new love interest for Martin. Guest cast members in these series included Keith Barron, playing an English deputy Mayor; Tim Healy, playing Geoff's transvestite blind date Les (Lesley) Conroy; Robin Askwith playing Gary, a conman and a thief who was revealed as Brandy's lover; Una Stubbs made an appearance in the final episode as Martin's mother, Diana; Stuart McGugan played Donald's practical-joking friend Wink McAndrew, who electrocuted himself to death on-stage at Neptune's; whilst Lorraine Bruce appeared as one of Madge's estranged daughters. Healy would go on to make a further guest appearance in the 2010 Christmas special, before becoming a cast regular in the fourth series. Other guest stars in the Christmas special included Louie Spence, portraying the role of Marvin; Brian Murphy played the role of Noreen's love interest Clive Mitchell; whereas Su Pollard, Asa Eliott and Roy Wood appeared as themselves.

A number of new characters were introduced for series 4, including Liam Conroy (Adam Gillen), the son of Les, the latter now also a cast regular; Sam Wood (Shelley Longworth) and her good friend Natalie Jones (Kathryn Drysdale); Kenneth Du Beke (Tony Maudsley), a hairdresser at Gavin and Troy's hair salon in Derbyshire, taking Troy's place on holiday with Gavin; and Pauline Maltby (Selina Griffiths), the daughter of Noreen on holiday with her in the place of Geoff. The Garvey family (now only including Pemberton, Finneran, Reid and Stokes), Donald and Jacqueline (Ireland and Duvitski), Mateo (Canuso), Janey (Rock) returned from series 3. There was also a variety of guest appearances, including Neil Fitzmaurice as "Lucky Kev", Cilla Black as herself, Denise Welch as "Scary Mary", Melvyn Hayes as "Mr Pink" and Ian Reddington as Johnny Neptune. Michael Fenton Stevens was also introduced, making the first of his many guest appearances, as Sir Henry, the head of the British consulate. Johnny Vegas, Hannah Hobley, Abigail Cruttenden and Nicholas Burns did not return; Paul Bazely did not return until the final episode, due to his filming commitments after joining the cast of Pirates of the Caribbean: On Stranger Tides.

Prior to the fifth series airing, Crissy Rock decided to leave in order to appear in the eleventh series of I'm a Celebrity...Get Me Out of Here!, though did make a one-off return. As a result, Sherrie Hewson joined the cast, playing the role of Joyce Temple-Savage, the new manageress of the Solana. Bazely, Drysdale and Griffiths were the only cast members of the fourth series to not return; Michelle Butterly was then cast in the role of Trudy, a character who accompanies Sam on holiday, thus acting as a replacement for Drysdale. All the remaining cast members returned. Alba Ortega had a brief role in the series, portraying the role of Carmen, the new colleague of Kenneth, who now owns a hair salon within the Solana. Asa Eliott, Elliott Jordan and Michael Fenton Stevens reprised their roles as himself, Jack and Sir Henry, respectively. This was the only series to feature Butterly, the last time Noreen featured until series 7 and Sam featured until series 9, and the last series to feature Sachs.

In series 6, a new family was added to the show at this point. The Dykes, a lively family from Watford, consist of father Clive (Perry Benson), his wife Tonya (Hannah Waddingham), their son Tiger (Danny Walters) and their daughter Bianca (Bel Powley). The Garveys, Donald and Jacqueline, Mateo, Lesley, Liam, Kenneth and Joyce all returned, whilst Nicholas Burns reprised his role as Martin Weedon after a five-year absence, alongside his friends on a stag holiday. There are guest appearances in this series, as Matthew Kelly plays Cyril Babcock (who also appeared in series 5), Elliott Jordan returns as Jack, Rustie Lee plays Queenie, Asa Elliott and The Krankies appear as themselves, legendary Hollywood star Joan Collins stars as Crystal Hennessy-Vass, the CEO of the Solana Hotel Group, Janet Street Porter makes a cameo appearance as a news reporter, and Holly Earl plays local girl Elena.

Benson, Canuso, Duvitski, Gillen, Healy, Hewson, Maudsley and Walters all returned as regulars for series 7; Finneran, Pemberton, Reid and Stokes also returned, but only appeared in the first two episodes which were written specifically to end their time on the show, whereas Waddingham and Powley did not return. Following Kenny Ireland's death, his character Donald Stewart did not appear, though Duvitski did return, with Alan David replacing Donald as reluctant swinger Glynn Flint; to script in Donald's absence, Glynn's wife Rhiannon (played by Ruth Madoc) was holidaying in France with Donald. Leslie Jordan guest starred as Buck A. Roo for two episodes, playing an attorney who revealed the Garveys had inherited $30,000,000 before whisking them off to Las Vegas. Johnny Vegas and Elsie Kelly returned during the series, whereas Denise Black guest starred as Gloria, Liam's mother. Collins also made a guest appearance, as did Crissy Rock. For series 8, Benson, Eaton and David did not return, whereas all others did, with Ireland's character being killed off-screen. In series 8, Julie Graham, Steve Edge, Bobby Knutt, Josh Bolt and Honor Kneafsey joined the cast as new family, the Dawsons. Jessica Ellerby and Nathan Bryon joined the cast as Amber Platt and Joey Ellis, respectively. Paul Bazely and Selina Griffiths returned, both having not appeared since series 4, whereas Sheila Reid re-appeared for a singular episode. Several previous guest stars returned, including Louis Emerick, Paul Chan, John Challis, Milanka Brooks and Joan Collins, while Kevin Bishop, Shane Richie and Leo Sayer appeared as new guests.

During filming of series 9, Healy fell ill whilst filming, resulting in him being written out for the second half of the series. All of the series 8 cast returned for the ninth series. Shelley Longworth reprised her role as Sam Wood for the ninth series, having not appeared since series 5. The following year, Laila Zaidi and Julian Moore-Cook joined the cast for series 10, whereas Vegas, Bazely, Walters and Kneafsey did not return, with Walters going on to join the cast of EastEnders. In September 2017, actor Bobby Knutt died; however, filming had already finished; the first episode was dedicated to him.

Filming
The Solana is the hotel featured in the show, where most of the characters stay. The pool scenes are filmed at the Sol Pelicanos Ocas Hotel in Benidorm, and the room scenes are filmed in the Acuariam II Apartments (which overlook the pool). The reception area and the salon is filmed in a studio set in a building opposite Benidorm Palace, known as "The Pink House".

Neptune's is an all-inclusive bar/restaurant featured in the show, and owned by The Solana. Most of the characters are seen here in the evening, where seemingly there is karaoke and live entertainment every night. Occasional guest appearances take place from singer Asa Elliott, and previously Shaun Foster Conley. Neptune's is filmed in Morgan's Tavern, near to Sol Pelicanos Ocas, where the pool scenes are filmed.  Scenes showing cast members leaving Neptune's were filmed using a false facade on the bar area of Sol Pelicanos Ocas, forming a continuum with other outdoor scenes.

Cancellation
In July 2018, it was confirmed that Benidorm would not be returning for an eleventh series, just weeks after the tenth series had concluded. Ratings had steadily declined throughout the last few series, with the events of series 10 acting as a conclusion to the characters' journeys. Litten went on to create a new sitcom for BBC One, entitled Scarborough, which featured a variety of former Benidorm cast members.

Characters

Spin-offs

American adaptation
Television network FOX has commissioned an American adaptation of the sitcom, named The Big Package. The adaptation will be set in a Mexican holiday resort, with the plot revolving around a Bostonian family, similar to the Garvey family, who go on holiday to escape their financial issues. The title of the adaptation derives from the three-star resort it is set at, which offers a "big package deal". Writers Chris Alberghini and Mike Chessler will be adapting Derren Litten's scripts for the show. As of October 2016 the show was slated for a 2017 debut, but by the autumn of 2021 it had yet to air.

Benidorm Live

In 2017, dates were announced for a major theatre tour of the sitcom's stage adaptation. The tour began in Newcastle-upon-Tyne, England at the Theatre Royal on 7 September 2018 Two hundred and thirty-five shows were scheduled to take place in various locations throughout the United Kingdom and Ireland.

Awards

References

External links
 
 
 
 
 Benidorm at British TV Comedy
 Benidorm at TigerAspect.co.uk
 Benidorm TV Fansite Benidorm TV Fansite

2007 British television series debuts
2018 British television series endings
2000s British sitcoms
2010s British sitcoms
 
English-language television shows
ITV sitcoms
Television series by Banijay
Television series by Tiger Aspect Productions
Television series set in hotels
Television shows filmed in Spain
Television shows set in Spain
Television shows set in the Valencian Community